The Ministry of Interior is one of the governmental bodies of Kuwait. Its minister in charge is a member of the Cabinet of Kuwait and the current minister of interior is Ahmad Nawaf Al-Ahmad Al-Sabah.

History from 1928
The early organization which dealt with internal affairs was the Directorate of Public Security Force, formed  during the Interwar period in 1938 by Ahmad Al-Jaber Al-Sabah and mainly taking effect following World War II. Prior to 1938, internal security was dependent on the Defense Security Forces which were headed by Sheikh Ali Salem Al-Mubarak Al-Sabah. Following the Battle of Al-Regeai, command of the Defense and Security Forces was assigned to Shiekh Abdullah Jaber Al-Abdullah II Al-Sabah, who was appointed by Sheikh Ahmad Al-Jaber Al-Sabah and was commanding from 1928 to 1938.

Defense and Interior Command Prior to 1961

Battle General Commanders of Defense and Security Forces (1928–1938)

Directors of the Directorate of Public Security Force, Directorate of Police, Kuwait Army (1938–1962) 
The Kuwait Army split from the Directorate of Public Security Force in 1953; subsequently, the latter merged with Directorate of Police to form Directorate of Public Security and Police in 1959; following the demolition of the defensive wall of Kuwait in 1957 which later formed the Kuwait Ministry of Interior including the Kuwait Police.

Directors of the Directorate of Public Security Force, Directorate of Police and Kuwait Army

Directors of the Directorate of Public Security Force and Directorate of Police (1959)

Deputy Directors of the Directorate of Public Security Force, Directorate of Police and Kuwait Army (1938–1962)
In 1953 and aside of the Police Directorate; the Kuwait Army split from the Directorate of Public Security Force which gave rise to the Kuwaiti Ministry of Interior and Ministry of Defense following the country's independence.

Deputy Directors of the Directorate of Public Security Force, Directorate of Police and Kuwait Army (1938–1962)

Deputy Commander of the Kuwait Army (1953–1954)

List of Ministers of Interior and Deputy Prime Ministers (1962–present)
The ministers of interior of Kuwait since 1962:

Organization and activities
The major responsibilities of the ministry are public security, and law and order. The major internal security organization under the ministry is the national police. The ministry is also responsible for managing the election process together with the ministry of justice.

The ministry has 48 service centers and 62 police stations in Capital, Farwaniya, Jahra, Hawalli, Ahmadi, and Mubarak Al Kabir regions across Kuwait. In 2008, a rehabilitation center was launched in the ministry in order to deal with those Kuwaiti citizens holding radical religious views. The ministry established special teams consisting of members of non-governmental organizations to eliminate vote-buying before the 2012 general elections.

References

1962 establishments in Kuwait
Interior
Kuwait
Kuwait, Interior